The 150s decade ran from January 1, 150, to December 31, 159.

Significant people
 Antoninus Pius, Roman Emperor (138–161)

References